Prokopy Timofeevich Zubarev (Russian: Прокопий Тимофеевич Зубарев; February 1886 – 15 March 1938) was a Soviet politician and statesman. He was purged and executed during the "anti-Trotskyist" repressions of Stalin.

Biography 
Zubarev was born in to a peasant family and was a Bolshevik from 1904. From 1915 to 1917, he served in the Imperial Russian Army in World War I. He served in the Soviet of the Ufa Governorate in 1922. In 1929, he served in the Northern Krai Soviet.

Prokopy Zubarev was one of the defendants in the Case of the Anti-Soviet "Bloc of Rights and Trotskyites" of 2-13 March 1938. He was accused of disrupting the food supply and having been a member of the czarist secret police. On 13 March 1938 he was sentenced to death and on 15 March 1938 he was executed by the NKVD via firing squad. He was rehabilitated in 1965.

References

1886 births
1938 deaths
People from Kotelnichsky District
People from Kotelnichsky Uyezd
Old Bolsheviks
Case of the Anti-Soviet "Bloc of Rightists and Trotskyites"
Great Purge victims from Russia
People executed by the Soviet Union
Communist Party of the Soviet Union members